Father Leo J. Austin Catholic Secondary School (also known as Father Leo, Leo J. Austin, FLJA, or Austin for short) is a coeducational, Catholic, secondary school located in Whitby, Ontario, Canada, and it is managed by the Durham Catholic District School Board (DCDSB). Today, it is an active school and is open for students grade 9 to 12. It’s one of the Catholic high schools in the DCDSB to offer the French Immersion program which draws students around the Durham Region.

History
Father Leo J. Austin was a priest born in Toronto on June 3, 1939. He was a priest at St. John the Evangelist Catholic Church located in Giffard Street in Whitby. Before coming to Whitby in 1956, he served in several Toronto parishes. Catholic education was of particular interest to Father Austin: in 1959 he brought the Grey Sisters, a teaching order of nuns, to Whitby; under his guidance, St. Theresa Catholic School was built, and St. Leo Catholic School in Brooklin; he built four additions to St. John the Evangelist Catholic School, and started Archbishop Denis O'Connor Catholic High School in 1964 in Whitby (was moved to Ajax in 1984). Because of his great contribution to the community of Whitby, the school, Father Leo J. Austin Catholic Secondary School, was created and named after him.

The building currently housing Father Leo J. Austin was officially opened following the Thanksgiving weekend of 1990, though classes had been ongoing since the Labour Day weekend of 1989 in 2 separate temporary locations.

In 2014, the school celebrated the 25th anniversary of its opening in 1989.

Academic programs and features
 Advanced placement credits in grade 12 math; calculus and vectors, and advanced functions.
 Pre-AP courses in math from grade 9-11.
 Multiple Specialized High Skills Major (SHSM) programs.
 Extended French programs for students in grade 9-12.
 Religion courses offered in the school for grades 9-12; taking Religion is mandatory for all students.
 Head start program for students transitioning into grade 9.
 The Ontario Youth Apprenticeship Program (OYAP) offered in grade 11 and 12 for students who want to explore and work in apprenticeship occupations.
Cooperative Education  (Co-Op), a program that allows students to earn credits while completing a work placement in the community.

Pre- and Advanced Placement (AP)
The AP program of Austin is recognized by universities in both Canada and the United States.
One can earn advanced standing at university in mathematics through their AP advanced functions, and calculus and vectors courses.
Enriched (pre-AP) math credits are also available in grades 9, 10, and 11, as they are prerequisites for students if they wish to take the Advanced Placement Exam in their grade 12 year.

Specialized High Skills Major (SHSM)
The SHSM is a program provided in the school that lets students focus on a career path that matches their skills and interests while meeting the requirements of the Ontario Secondary School Diploma (OSSD).

SHSM programs that are offered in the school:
 Arts and Culture
 Business
 Hospitality and Tourism
 Information and Communications Technology
 Justice, Community Safety and Emergency Services

Extended French program
At Austin, the Extended French program is offered from grades 9 to 12 which provide students with the means to develop more advanced French skills, enabling them to communicate effectively in speech and in writing. In this program, there are courses that provide opportunities for students to speak and interact in French in a variety of real-life and personally relevant contexts.

Only students that have received a minimum of 1,260 hours of extended French instruction by the end of their grade 8 year may be enrolled in this program.

Religion program 
At Austin, religion is not an elective and must be taken. Religious education is an academic subject that strengthens religious literacy and critical thinking. At the end of the term, there is a religious exam for the course. Students must take this course seriously like they would in any of their courses as four credits of Religion is needed for students to receive a secondary school graduation diploma.

For the students in grade 9, 10, and 12 the Religion course they must take  invites them to study Catholicism and to have a deeper understanding of following Christ and living out the call to discipleship as students study the Sacred Scriptures.

In grade 11, students must take World Religion which allows students to explore various world religions and belief traditions.

Co-curricular activities
There are many co-curricular activities that are offered to the students at Father Leo J. Austin. Austin has a traditional Student Council which students are encouraged to join and are elected to be part of. Student Council represents the student body voice, initiates school and social events for students, and help distribute/collect funds from fundraising events. Student council helps form events along with the Leadership class at the school.

The other student activities and organizations that are offered at the school include Photography Club, Guitar Club, Salsa Club, Choir, Junior and Senior Concert Band, Jazz Band, Reach for the Top, Renaissance, Amnesty International, Just Youth, Fitness Friends, Peer Ministry, Prefects, OSAID, Robotics, The Slant (Newspaper), Austin Rights Club, Yearbook, C.A.S.H. (Caring About Student Health), Animal Care Crew, Drama Club, Austin Spirit Team and Retreat Leaders, White Pine Reading, Black History Month Committee, Prom Committee, The Tech Crew, The Green Team, Athletic Council, Art Club, robotics club, Writers circle, LGBTQ club and The Pro-Life Club, and a League of Legends team.

Athletics
Father Leo J. Austin Catholic Secondary School offers a fairly wide range of athletic teams including soccer, basketball, ice hockey, badminton, curling, volleyball, lacrosse, rugby, track and field, cross country, varsity girls fastball, varsity boys baseball, golf, tennis, dance, and table tennis.

Uniforms
The uniform is a source of honour and a builder of the school community at Father Leo J. Austin Catholic Secondary School. When enrolling at the school, all students agree to wear it neatly and uniforms must be in good repair. Uniforms must not be altered in any way as to change design or style of the clothing.

Notable alumni
Keara Graves, actress
Jay Harrison, Professional hockey player
John LaFontaine, Lacrosse player
Priscilla Lopes-Schliep, Olympic hurdler
Gavin Prout, Lacrosse player, member of the Canadian team that won the 2006 World Lacrosse Championship
Paul Ranger, Professional hockey player
Jonah Gadjovich, Professional hockey player
 Joel Watson, Professional lacrosse player
Kailen Sheridan, International soccer player, Olympic gold medalist
Jessica Klimkait, Olympic judoka

See also
List of high schools in Ontario

References

External links

Profile at the Education Quality and Accountability Office (EQAO)

Educational institutions established in 1989
High schools in the Regional Municipality of Durham
Education in Whitby, Ontario
Catholic secondary schools in Ontario
1989 establishments in Ontario